Interswitch is a leading African integrated payments and digital commerce platform company headquartered in Lagos. Founded in 2002 in Nigeria, as a transaction switching and processing company with national focus, Interswitch progressively evolved to incorporate consumer financial services with the successive launches of Quickteller, a retail payments ecosystem linking merchants and billers with consumers, as well as Verve, a homegrown, EMV-certified payments card scheme.

History

After using an ATM for the first time in Scotland, Mitchell Elegbe developed an idea to create electronic payment infrastructure in Nigeria while he was working on implementing SWIFT. Working at Telnet, his boss approved the transaction switch. However most players he sold to were not interested in the software for switching; this led him to creating Interswitch so as to meet his targets. With the assistance of Accenture, Elegbe and his team established the company, of which he then became CEO.
In 2010 two thirds of the company was sold to a consortium led by Helios Investment Partners. In 2011 Interswitch took a 60 per cent stake in Bankom in Uganda.

In 2013 Interswitch entered into an agreement for payment processing with Discover Financial Services. 

In September 2014 the company acquired a majority shareholding in Paynet Group, an East-African payments provider.

In 2015 Interswitch launched a $10m investment fund for African start-ups in the payments sector.

In February 2018, Interswitch unveiled its SPAK National Science Competition to promote and reward excellence in Science, Technology, Engineering and Mathematics in Nigeria.

Operations and subsidiaries 

The Interswitch company was established as, common African financial services provider and maintains exclusively, a wide array of interconnected datacenters in Africa. The company has over 11,000 ATMs on its network, with more users in Nigeria than anywhere else.

Verve, a payment card industry is another subsidiary of Interswitch. Verve has also been launched in Kenya.

Interswitch also owns Quickteller, originally cited as a Telecommunication airtime vendor, additionally, providing payments services. 

Interswitch systems deploys sophisticated inter-networking security and firewalls, as common brand innovation. 

In October 2020, Quickteller launched the Qtrybe community, a community of 50 exceptional students from Nigerian tertiary institutions to serve as ambassadors of Quickteller and Interswitch on their campuses.

References

Financial services companies established in 2002
Financial services companies of Nigeria
Companies based in Lagos
Nigerian brands